Vanished Gardens is a studio album made in collaboration between jazz saxophonist Charles Lloyd, the backing band The Marvels, and roots music singer-songwriter Lucinda Williams, released on June 29, 2018, by Blue Note Records. The album has received positive critical reception.

Critical reception

 The editorial staff of AllMusic Guide gave the release 3.5 out of five stars, with reviewer Thom Jurek praising the performance: "they create a music that draws on the sum total of experience and shared emotion". In Rolling Stone, Hank Shteamer gave the same score, noting the "savvy stylistic blend", summing up, "As diverse as the material here is, there’s no sense that Lloyd is putting on different hats. Like his career as a whole, Vanished Gardens shows how the many currents of American music all flow into a single stream." NPR's Nate Chinen found emotional resonance in the collaboration, with Lloyd and Williams "open[ing] windows to each other's souls".

Will Layman of PopMatters situated the recording in Lloyd's musical evolution, as part of his exploration of Americana, with praise for the instrumentals but a special attention to the five vocals tracks where Williams appears. Writing for All About Jazz, Mike Jurkovic gave the album 4.5 out of five stars, with positive assessments of each track, noting the competing lyrical content of mortality and hope. Neil Spencer of The Guardian calls the collaboration an "odd couple" considering the musicians' distinct backgrounds but writes that "this unexpected collaboration doesn’t miss a trick"; he gave it four out of five stars. The Associated Press' Pablo Gorondi also noted the blending of styles, calling this "a dynamic ensemble’s testament to creativity, musicianship and independence" and in The Boston Globe, Jon Garelick emphasized the somber tone of the music and the uplifting benediction of the musicians' cover of "Angel".

Accolades

Track listing
"Defiant" (Charles Lloyd) – 8:44
"Dust" (Lucinda Williams) – 8:00
"Vanished Gardens" (Lloyd) – 9:05
"Ventura" (Williams) – 6:24
"Ballad of the Sad Young Men" (Fran Landesman and Tommy Wolf) – 6:19
"We've Come Too Far to Turn Around" (Williams) – 6:32
"Blues for Langston and LaRue" (Lloyd) – 5:40
"Unsuffer Me" (Williams) – 11:42
"Monk's Mood" (Thelonious Monk) – 5:18
"Angel" (Jimi Hendrix) – 5:53

Personnel
Charles Lloyd & The Marvels
Charles Lloyd – alto flute, tenor saxophone, vocals, band leader, production
Bill Frisell – guitar
Eric Harland – drums
Greg Leisz – dobro, pedal steel guitar
Reuben Rogers – double bass
Lucinda Williams – vocals

Additional personnel
Dorothy Darr – art design, photography, production
Will Delaney – assistant engineering
Bernie Grundman – mastering
Joe Harley – poetry
Paul Moore – layout
Michael C. Ross – engineering, mixing
Tyler Shields – assistant engineering
Don Was – production

Charts

See also
List of 2018 albums

References

External links
Announcement from Blue Note
Press release from Blue Note

Vanished Gardens at Rate Your Music

2018 albums
Lucinda Williams albums
Charles Lloyd (jazz musician) albums
Blue Note Records albums
Collaborative albums
Albums produced by Lucinda Williams
Albums produced by Don Was